Nivrathi Suryanarayanashastry Satya Murthy (5 February 1936–8 October 1984) was an Indian physicist and the head of the Nuclear Physics Division of Bhabha Atomic Research Centre. Known for his research in Molecular reaction dynamics, Murthy was an elected fellow of the Indian National Science Academy, National Academy of Sciences, India and Indian Academy of Sciences. The Council of Scientific and Industrial Research, the apex agency of the Government of India for scientific research, awarded him the Shanti Swarup Bhatnagar Prize for Science and Technology, one of the highest Indian science awards, for his contributions to Physical Sciences in 1980.

Biography 

N. S. Satya Murthy, who held a PhD from University of Bombay (1967), served as an assistant director at Bhabha Atomic Research Centre and as the head of the Nuclear Physics Division of the institution. His research was focused on magnetic materials and his studies of the materials with the help of thermal neutrons have widened the understanding of the subject. Murthy and his team were credited with the discovery of novel magnetic structures and a polarizer for thermal neutrons. His contributions have been reported in the design of neutron facilities of Dhruva reactor and he led a group of scientists who conceptualized and fabricated several components of the reactor. Murthy also contributed in developing superconducting magnets at BARC and his work assisted in the development of Yafet-Kittel type of ferrimagnetism. His studies have been documented by way of a number of articles and the article repository of the Indian Academy of Sciences has listed 23 of them. Besides, he published a monograph, Magnetism, along with L. Madhav Rao and his work has been cited by other scientists.

Murthy introduced such experimental techniques as Compton profile spectroscopy, Mossbauer spectroscopy and Raman spectroscopy at BARC and pioneered basic research on subjects like electron states, of cooperative effects and long wavelength excitations. He contributed to the establishment of Raja Ramanna Centre for Advanced Technology and was one of the founders of the Magnetics Society of India where he also served as the vice president. Murthy coordinated academic courses on Magnetism and Integrated Circuits for Indian Physics Association and was the general secretary of the organization for two terms from 1973 to 1977. He was also an editorial board member of Bulletin of Materials Science.

Satya Murthy died on 8 October 1984, at the age of 48.

Awards and honors 
The Indian Academy of Sciences elected Murthy as a fellow in 1975. The Council of Scientific and Industrial Research awarded him the Shanti Swarup Bhatnagar Prize, one of the highest Indian science awards in 1979. He became an elected fellow of the Indian National Science Academy in 1981. He was also a life member of the Magnetics Society of India. The Indian Physics Association has instituted an annual award, N. S. Satya Murthy Memorial Award for recognizing research excellence in physical sciences among young scientists.

Selected bibliography

See also 

 Magnetic moment
 Neutron scattering

Notes

References 

1936 births
1984 deaths
Indian nuclear physicists
20th-century Indian physicists
Indian scientific authors
University of Mumbai alumni
Recipients of the Shanti Swarup Bhatnagar Award in Medical Science
Fellows of the Indian Academy of Sciences
Fellows of the Indian National Science Academy